Col d'Aspin (elevation ) is a mountain pass in the French Pyrenees in the department of the Hautes-Pyrénées. It connects Sainte-Marie-de-Campan, in the upper Adour valley, with Arreau, on the River Neste.

Details of the climbs

In comparison with its neighbour, the Col du Tourmalet, this is considered an "easy" climb, with only the last five kilometres, at about 8%, being difficult.

From  Arreau (east), the climb is more difficult; over  the climb averages 6.5%, gaining  in height.

On both sides of the Col de l'Aspin mountain pass cycling milestones are placed every kilometre.  They indicate the height of the summit, the distance to the summit, the current height, and the average slope in the following kilometre. Such signposting for cyclists has become common in most major mountain passes in the French Pyrenees and Alps.

Tour de France
The pass has been part of the Tour de France 71 times, largely because it is the middle link in a chain of three road climbs, the other links being the Col du Tourmalet and Col de Peyresourde. The first time the Col d'Aspin was crossed was in 1910, when the leader over the summit was Octave Lapize.

In the 1950 Tour, there was an altercation at the pass, with bottles and stones being thrown at the riders, and the Italian team with Gino Bartali and Fiorenzo Magni, the leaders at the time, withdrew from the Tour at the end of the stage from Pau to Saint-Gaudens.

Appearances in Tour de France since 1947

References

External links

Cycling profile of both sides 
Complete list of leaders over summit 
Col d'Aspin on Google Maps (Tour de France classic climbs)

Mountain passes of Hautes-Pyrénées
Mountain passes of the Pyrenees
Climbs in cycle racing in France